Villa cingulata  is a Palearctic species of bee fly in the family Bombyliidae.

Distribution
Afghanistan, Albania, Armenia, Austria, Azerbaijan, Belgium, Bosnia-Hercegovina, Croatia, Czech Republic, Finland, France, Germany, Greece, Georgia, Hungary, Iran, Italy (incl. Sardinia, Sicily), Luxemburg, Macedonia, Moldova, Netherlands, Poland.

References

External links
Van Veen

Bombyliidae
Insects described in 1804
Diptera of Europe
Diptera of Asia
Taxa named by Johann Wilhelm Meigen